Thai Airways International Flight 114, a Thai Airways International Boeing 737-400 bound for Chiang Mai from Don Mueang Airport in Bangkok, was destroyed by an explosion of the center fuel tank resulting from ignition of the flammable fuel/air mixture in the tank while the aircraft was parked prior to boarding on the ground on 3 March 2001. The source of the ignition energy for the explosion could not be determined with certainty, but the most likely source was an explosion originating at the center wing tank pump as a result of running the pump in the presence of metal shavings and a fuel/air mixture. One flight attendant died.

The passenger manifest included many government VIPs, Prime Minister Thaksin Shinawatra and his son, Panthongtae.  No passengers had yet boarded the plane; only a few staff members were on board at the time of the explosion.

See also
Philippine Airlines Flight 143
TWA Flight 800
Pan Am Flight 214

References

External links

 THAI Holds Press Conference Concerning TG 114 Incident - Thai Airways International
 NTSB Information

2001 in Bangkok
Aviation accidents and incidents in Thailand
Aviation accidents and incidents in 2001
114
Accidents and incidents involving the Boeing 737 Classic
March 2001 events in Thailand